Wisconsin Referendum 1 of 2006 was a referendum on an amendment to the Wisconsin Constitution that would invalidate same-sex marriages or any substantially similar legal status. The referendum was approved by 59% of voters during the general elections in November 2006. All counties in the state voted for the amendment except Dane County (home of the state capital, Madison), which opposed it. The constitutional amendment created by Referendum 1 has been effectively nullified since June 26, 2015, when the United States Supreme Court ruled in Obergefell v. Hodges that state-level bans on same-sex marriage are unconstitutional.

Amendment
The text of the adopted amendment, which became Article XIII, Section 13 of the state constitution, reads:

As required by the constitution, the amendment was approved by both houses of the legislature, in two consecutive sessions. The legislative history of the amendment is as follows:

March 5, 2004: Approved by Wisconsin State Assembly by a vote of 68-27.
March 12, 2004: Approved by Wisconsin State Senate by a vote of 20-13
December 6, 2005: Approved by the State Senate a second time, by a vote of 19-14.
February 28, 2006: Approved by the State Assembly a second time.
November 7, 2006: Approved by referendum, by a margin of 59.4%-40.6%.

Legal challenge

In April 2009 the Wisconsin Supreme Court was asked in McConkey v. Van Hollen to rule on whether the 2006 Referendum 1 was constitutional. William McConkey, a political science instructor, claimed that the measure violated the state's constitution because it proposed more than one question in a single ballot proposal, which is impermissible under Wisconsin law. On June 30, 2010, the Court ruled that the amendment is constitutional. However, on June 6, 2014 the United States District Court for the Western District of Wisconsin overturned all bans on same-sex marriage in the state. On October 6, 2014, same sex marriage was legalized in Wisconsin.

References

External links
2005 Enrolled Joint Resolution 30

U.S. state constitutional amendments banning same-sex unions
2006 in LGBT history
2006 Wisconsin elections
2006 ballot measures
Wisconsin ballot measures
LGBT in Wisconsin
Same-sex marriage ballot measures in the United States